Julie Thomas may refer to:
Julie Thomas (bowls), Welsh lawn bowls player
Julie Thomas (politician), Chief Minister of Saint Helena